Norman Cornelius (5 June 1886 – 21 October 1963) was an English cricketer. He played for Gloucestershire between 1910 and 1911.

References

1886 births
1963 deaths
English cricketers
Gloucestershire cricketers
People from Crosby, Merseyside